Fouzia Rhissassi (born April 15, 1947) is a Moroccan professor of social sciences at the faculty of arts at Ibn Tofail University in Kenitra, Morocco. Currently she holds a position of the UNESCO Chair on Women Rights.

Biography
Fouzia Rhissassi was born in Fes, Morocco on April 15, 1947.

Rhissassi has been teaching since 1974. She supervised numerous B.A, M.A and Ph.D theses throughout her career.

With her work in women’s studies and peace for/in the Arab world, Prof. Rhissassi has written numerous publications: co-director of Pulpit UNESCO "The Woman and Her Rights" with Abderrazak Moulayrohid in 2004, "Moroccan Women Writers of Arabic Expression", and Gender Studies: "core educational concepts, values and operations for ensuring sustainable societies; the case of Morocco". In addition to writing numerous publications she has also participated in several events as either a speaker or delegate with regards to her expertise.

Publications
 La citoyenneté féminine au Maroc ("Women and citizenship in Morocco")
 Le discours sur la femme, Fouzia Rhissassi (ed.), Rabat, 1998
 Images de femmes: regards de société, (with Khadija Amiti), 2004 
 Femmes et etat de droit: actes du Colloque International organisé les 19 et 20 Avril 2002 à la Faculté de Droit Souissi, Rabat - Maroc. (with Abderrazak Moulay Rachid)
 A textual study of Thomas Hardy's Life's little ironies, Faculté des lettres et des sciences humaines, Université Mohammed V, Rabat, 1994
 Stéréotypie, images et représentations des femmes en milieu rural et/ou urbain (with Leila Messaoudi), Fennec, 2008.
  Les cahiers du genre (with Isabelle Jacquet). Éditions le fennec, 2007.

Awards and honors
Award 2006 in the category of Human Rights  (the award is given annually to prominent Moroccan women for their achievements) 
The Wissam of the Alouite Throne, 1993
The title of the chevalier de l’ordre de la Couronne by his Majesty King Albert II, 2004, Belgium
Gold Leaf of the embassy of Canada in Morocco, 2007

References

External links
Leconomiste.com
Ceped.org
Lamarocaine.com

1947 births
Living people
Moroccan writers
Moroccan writers in French
Moroccan essayists
UNESCO officials
Moroccan women writers
Moroccan officials of the United Nations